Chuden-mae is a Hiroden station (tram stop) on Hiroden Ujina Line located in Ote-machi 3-chome, Naka-ku, Hiroshima.

Routes
From Chuden-mae Station, there are three of Hiroden Streetcar routes.

 Hiroshima Station - Hiroshima Port Route
 Hiroden-nishi-hiroshima - Hiroshima Port Route
 Yokogawa Station - Hiroden-honsha-mae Route

Connections
█ Ujina Line
  
Fukuro-machi — Chuden-mae — Shiyakusho-mae

Around station
Chugoku Electric Power Company Head Office

History
Opened as "Seitou-bashi" tram stop, named from the bridge "Seitou", on November 23, 1912.
Renamed to "Shirakami-mae", named from the shrine "Shirakami", in 1919.
Renamed to "Shirakamisha-mae" in 1945.
Moved to the present place and renamed to the present name "Chuden-mae", on March 22, 1971.

References

See also
Hiroden Streetcar Lines and Routes

Chuden-mae Station
Railway stations in Japan opened in 1914